Collin Cameron (born 31 March 1988 in Barrie, Ontario) is a Canadian sitskier who won three bronze medals at the 2018 Winter Paralympics. and two silver and a gold medal at the 2019 Para Nordic World Championships in Prince George, BC, CAN. He also participated at the 2022 Winter Paralympics, winning two bronze medals in the 18 kilometre long-distance event, and the 1.5 kilometre sprint event.

References

External links 
 
 

1988 births
Biathletes at the 2018 Winter Paralympics
Canadian male biathletes
Canadian male cross-country skiers
Cross-country skiers at the 2018 Winter Paralympics
Cross-country skiers at the 2022 Winter Paralympics
Living people
Medalists at the 2018 Winter Paralympics
Medalists at the 2022 Winter Paralympics
Paralympic biathletes of Canada
Paralympic bronze medalists for Canada
Paralympic cross-country skiers of Canada
Sportspeople from Greater Sudbury
Paralympic medalists in cross-country skiing